Qıraqlı (also, Kragly and Kyragly) is a village and municipality in the Saatly Rayon of Azerbaijan. It was formed in 1992 through the division of the village Leninkənd into two parts. The other part became the village of Mustafabəyli. Qıraqlı has a population of 3,454.

Notable natives 
 Elshan Huseynov — National Hero of Azerbaijan.

References 

Populated places in Saatly District